was a Japanese volleyball player and coach.

Life 
Born in Kamiagatagun (present-day Tsushima), Nagasaki Prefecture, he graduated from Nagasaki Prefectural Shimabara Commercial High School, where he became a coach after his retirement from active play.

He died on December 20, 2013, in Tokyo from stomach cancer.

Player
Suntory Sunbirds（1988-?）
Summer Olympics - 1992
World Cup - 1989, 1991, 1995
World Championship - 1990, 1994

Prizes 
1989　Best Hitter
1990　Best 6
1991　Best 6
1992　Best 6
1993　Best Hitter and Best 6

References 

Olympic volleyball players of Japan
Japanese volleyball coaches
Sportspeople from Nagasaki Prefecture
1969 births
2013 deaths
Deaths from stomach cancer
Deaths from cancer in Japan
Volleyball players at the 1992 Summer Olympics
Asian Games medalists in volleyball
Volleyball players at the 1990 Asian Games
Volleyball players at the 1994 Asian Games
Japanese men's volleyball players
Medalists at the 1990 Asian Games
Medalists at the 1994 Asian Games
Asian Games gold medalists for Japan
Asian Games bronze medalists for Japan
20th-century Japanese people